The  is an equestrian sport venue located in Setagaya, Tokyo. The venue is owned by the Japan Racing Association and is a public park all year round, known familiarly as 'Horse Park'.

It was constructed in 1940 for the Olympics, but after the Games were cancelled, it was used for the promotion of equestrian events as well as for the training of prospective jockeys. This venue hosted most equestrian competitions at the Tokyo 1964 Games.

References 

Sports venues in Tokyo
1940 establishments in Japan
Equestrian sports in Japan